Rhynchodemini is a tribe of land planarians in the subfamily Rhynchodeminae.

Description
The tribe Rhynchodemini is defined as containing land planarians with an elongate, cylindroid form, two eyes near the anterior end and strong subepithelial musculature in which the longitudinal fibers are grouped into large bundles. The copulatory apparatus lacks a penis papilla or has it greatly reduced.

Genera
The tribe Rhynchodemini contains six genera:
Anisorhynchodemus Kawakatsu, Froehlich, Jones, Ogren & Sasaki, 2003
Cotyloplana Spencer, 1892
Digonopyla Fischer, 1926
Dolichoplana Moseley, 1877
Platydemus von Graff, 1896
Rhynchodemus Leidy, 1851

References

Geoplanidae